Peter Stockton Ramsden (born 1951) is a retired British bishop in the Church of England who was the Bishop of Port Moresby in the Anglican Church of Papua New Guinea from 2007 to 2014 and is currently, since 2015, an honorary assistant bishop in the Diocese of Carlisle.

Ramsden attended Birkenhead School and University College London, graduating BSc in 1974. He trained for ordination at the College of the Resurrection, Mirfield, and was ordained deacon in 1977 and priest in 1978.

Ramsden served his title at St Michael and All Angels' Church, Houghton-le-Spring (1977–80) and a second curacy at All Saints and St Mary with St Martin, South Shields, (1980–83). He then served in Papua New Guinea, in the Diocese of Aipo Rongo (1983–90), returning to England to be priest-in-charge of St Mary the Virgin, Micklefield (1990–93), and again in Papua New Guinea (1993–96). He returned to England once more, as Vicar of St Bartholomew's Church, Long Benton, (1996-2007), before being announced in 2006 as the next Bishop of Port Moresby, in succession to Peter Fox.

Ramsden retired in 2014 and the following year was appointed an honorary assistant bishop in the Diocese of Carlisle.

References

1951 births
21st-century Anglican bishops in Oceania
Living people
Place of birth missing (living people)
Alumni of the College of the Resurrection
Papua New Guinean bishops
Anglican bishops of Port Moresby